For the Common Good (Per il Bene Comune, PBC) was a left-wing electoral list in Italy. Its leader was Stefano Montanari.

The list, that ran in the 2008 general election, was supported by:
Citizens' Political Movement (Movimento Politico dei Cittadini) — a left-wing populist party formed by senator Fernando Rossi, a former member of the Party of Italian Communists, in September 2007;
Federation of Liberal Democrats (Federazione dei Liberaldemocratici) — a social-liberal party formed by Marco Marsili in October 2003;
Humanist Party (Partito Umanista) — a member party of the Humanist Movement;
Green Front (Fronte Verde) — a green party led by Vincenzo Galizia, former leader of the youth wing of the Tricolour Flame party.

In the 2008 general election the list won 0.33% of the vote (119.569 votes) for the Chamber of Deputies and 0.32% (105.827) for the Senate, despite being present only in some constituencies, and no seats.

References

External links
Official website

Defunct political party alliances in Italy
Political parties established in 2007
Political parties with year of disestablishment missing
2007 establishments in Italy